"My cup runneth over" is a quotation from the Hebrew Bible (Psalms:) and means "I have more than enough for my needs", though interpretations and usage vary.

In the Bible
This phrase, in Hebrew  (kōsî rəwāyāh), is translated in the traditionally used King James Version as my cup runneth over. Newer translations of the phrase include "my cup overflows" and "my cup is completely full". The 23rd psalm, in which this phrase appears, uses the image of God as a shepherd and the believer as a sheep well cared-for. Julian Morgenstern has suggested that the word translated as "cup" could contain a double meaning: both a "cup" in the normal sense of the word, and a shallow trough from which one would give water to a sheep.

Other interpreters have suggested that verses 5 and 6 of Psalm 23 do not carry forward the "shepherd" metaphor begun in verse 1, but that these two verses are set in some other, entirely human, setting. Andrew Arterbury and William Bellinger read these verses as providing a metaphor of God as a host, displaying hospitality to a human being. Thus, alongside other actions in Psalm 23, such as preparing a table, and anointing one's guest with oil, providing a full or even overflowing cup for him to drink from can be read as an illustration of God's generosity to the Psalmist.

In music

The phrase is the title of a popular song written by Harvey Schmidt with lyrics by Tom Jones, featured in the 1966 Broadway musical, I Do! I Do!, which starred Robert Preston and Mary Martin. The most popular recording of the song was made by Ed Ames in 1967, which was a #8 pop (#9 Can.) and #1 AC hit in the United States.

Other notable versions of the song are by:
 Al Martino – for his album Daddy's Little Girl (1967).
 Andy Russell – included in his album Such a Pretty World Today (1967).
 Aretha Franklin – recorded for her album Young, Gifted and Black (1972) but not used. Eventually included in the compilation album Rare & Unreleased Recordings from the Golden Reign of the Queen of Soul (2007)
 Bing Crosby & Kathryn Crosby – for the album Bing Crosby Live at the London Palladium (1976)
 Bobby Goldsboro – The Romantic, Wacky, Soulful, Rockin', Country, Bobby Goldsboro (1967).
 Des O'Connor – I Pretend (1968).
 Floyd Cramer – Class of '67''' (1967).
 Jerry Vale – Time Alone Will Tell and Other Great Hits of Today (1967).
 The Lennon Sisters – Somethin' Stupid (1967).
 By popular New Zealand barbershop quartet, the Musical Island Boys.

The quotation has been used extensively in other music. Rapper Project Pat employed the quotation in its most literal sense when he stated "Patron in my cup runneth over" in his song "I Keep That" from his post-incarceration album Crook by da Book: The Fed Story. Rap artists Eminem and Jay-Z have used it in "Rabbit Run" and "Can't Knock the Hustle" respectively, and Eminem has also used the phrase "His cup just runneth over, oh no!" in the song "Forever", while actor and musician Drake used it in "Ignant Shit" as well as in a collaborative song with Eminem called "Forever"; Justin Timberlake also uses the phrase "Sipping from your cup 'til it runneth over" on Jay-Z's song "Holy Grail". Rapper T.I. uses the term in his song "sorry", where the first words spoken on the track are "My cup runneth over...". Rock musicians have also used the phrase. It is in the opening lyrics of "December" by Collective Soul and in the opening line of the Alice in Chains song "Bleed the Freak", while the death metal band Aborted include the phrase as a lyric in "Pestiferous Subterfuge" and the virtual band Gorillaz referenced the phrase in "All Alone". A variation is also used in the song "So Appalled" from rapper/producer Kanye West's album My Beautiful Dark Twisted Fantasy when fellow rapper Cyhi the Prynce says "My cup overrunneth with hundreds," referring to one-hundred dollar bills. This line is also similar to rapper Jay-Z's line in his song "Can't Knock the Hustle" from his album Reasonable Doubt when he too says "My cup runneth over with hundreds." Childish Gambino references the quote in his song "53.49" when he says "Get your cup it runneth over once I got the juice." The words are exactly repeated in the song "Manifest" by the Fugees in their 1996 album The Score.

The quotation is also used in the song "Gorgeous" from the 1966 Broadway musical The Apple Tree, directed by Mike Nichols with music by Jerry Boc, lyrics by Sheldon Harnick, and a book by Bock and Harnick with contributions from Jerome Coopersmith. It starred Barbara Harris, Alan Alda, and Larry Blyden.

The quotation also features prominently in the James Brown song I Guess I'll Have to Cry, Cry, Cry, covered by The Wailers on Soul Rebels as "My Cup"; and in the Dennis Brown song "Here I come". It is also used by Tavares in their disco hit-song "Heaven Must Be Missing an Angel". It also features in the song "Desert Sand" by UB40 and in the Brandon Flowers song, "Magdalena", from the album Flamingo.

It also features in The Stone Roses' song "Tightrope", on their album Second Coming and in Andrew Bird's song "Pulaski at Night", which is also featured in the second-season premiere episode of Orange Is the New Black.

The quotation is also the title Kiki Rockwell's song. The phrase is used in the chorus as reference to greed along with other biblical references throught the song lyrics.

The quotation is also used in Kacey Musgraves’ song “I Miss You”, from her debut album Same Trailer Different Park.

The song "Sat in Your Lap" by Kate Bush from the album The Dreaming includes the lines: "My cup, she never overfloweth / It is I that moan and groaneth".

In video games
"My cup runneth over!" is screamed as an expression of ecstasy by the fictional character William Bedford Diego in the 1999 video game System Shock 2, while in World of Warcraft, fictional character Blood Prince Valanar uses the phrase during the "Blood Prince Council" encounter. Also Pandaren Brewmaster from Dota 2 uses it. "Your cup runneth over!" is also an achievement or trophy in Devil May Cry 4. In an easter egg in Day of the Tentacle there is a Victorian photograph resembling the character Max from Sam & Max Hit the Road with the caption "The late Max Attucks, his petard runneth over." In the MOBA Smite, it is the name of a Match of the Day where teams begin the match at max level with 12,000 gold. The quote is also quoted by one of the symbiotic demons in Call of Duty: Vanguard's zombies mode.
It is also used as a joke by popular YouTube gamer LetsGameItOut whenever he gains excessive amounts of in-game items or currency.

In television

"Thy cup runneth over" was the catch-phrase of the coverage of the 2010 FIFA World Cup on the Australian Special Broadcasting Service (SBS).

In the animated series Daria, the title character uses the phrase sarcastically in the episode "I Loathe a Parade".

In the second episode (“Hell Hath No Fury”) of the ABC sitcom GCB, Amanda and other waitresses of Boobilicious have "My Cup Runneth Over" printed on the backs of their T-shirts.

In the first episode of the second season of Sex and the City, Samantha uses the phrase "His cup runneth over", as a pun and in a more literal meaning, referring to a baseball player who wears a protective cup.

In an "A Few Minutes with Andy Rooney" segment on the topic of driveways, Rooney uses a modified version of the phrase: "Like the garage, the driveway is never quite big enough. There never has been a driveway big enough in the whole history of driveways. Our driveways runneth over."

DCI Gene Hunt remarks "Our cup runneth over" in series 1 episode 2 of Ashes to Ashes, most likely sarcastically as a respected lawyer has just arrived to represent a suspect CID has detained.

In Destiny 2 after the addition of "King's Fall" Raid, reward weapons had the trait "Runneth Over".

Other uses
It is used in the films A Tree Grows in Brooklyn and Hope Floats.

See also
 List of number-one adult contemporary singles of 1967 (U.S.)

Notes

References

Bibliography
 The Billboard Book of Top 40 Hits'', 6th Edition, 1996

Biblical phrases
1966 songs
Songs from musicals
1967 singles
RCA Victor singles
Ed Ames songs